Umbonium costatum is a species of sea snail, a marine gastropod mollusk in the family Trochidae, the top snails.

Description
The size of the shell varies between 12 mm and 25 mm. The heavy, solid shell has a depressed shape. Its spire is low-conoidal, the periphery rounded. The color pattern is whitish or light yellow, closely tessellated all over with blackish-olive or reddish-brown squarish spots. The tessellated color-markings sometimes form subcontinuous oblique bands. The surface is shining and polished, with strong spiral grooves above, generally 4 to 6 on the body whorl. The sutures are narrowly impressed, with a rather wide margin below them, which often shows a slight tendency to be tuberculate. The base of the shell is smooth, tessellated around the irregularly convex, flesh-colored central callus. The shell contains six whorls, the last a little concave above, convex beneath. The subquadrate aperture is pearly inside. The circular callus is heaviest in front of the aperture and behind the columellar lip. .

Distribution
This species occurs in the Sea of Japan and in the East China Sea.

References

 Higo, S., Callomon, P. & Goto, Y. (1999) Catalogue and Bibliography of the Marine Shell-Bearing Mollusca of Japan. Elle Scientific Publications, Yao, Japan, 749 pp.

External links
 To Barcode of Life (1 barcode)
 To Biodiversity Heritage Library (15 publications)
 To Encyclopedia of Life
 To GenBank (5 nucleotides; 1 proteins)
 To World Register of Marine Species
 

costatum
Gastropods described in 1839